WICB (91.7 FM) is a radio station licensed to serve Ithaca, New York, United States.  Established in 1947, the station is owned by Ithaca College.

WICB broadcasts an alternative music format to the greater Ithaca area. Along with alternative music, the student-run radio station reserves programming for several different formats—including jazz, reggae, urban/hip-hop, sports, news, and more. The station features news programming from Westwood One.

WICB also has a News and Sports Department run by student executives. They head this department and put on live news and sports every day as well as additional talks for local sporting events through the college and local community.

The radio station broadcasts locally at 91.7FM, as well as online streaming at wicb.org, iHeartRadio, TuneIn, and their own WICB app.

History
92 WICB began in 1947 with 10 watts of power, and operated from a Quonset hut in downtown Ithaca at the corner of Court and Cayuga Streets. It moved to the basement of Dillingham Center in 1968, then to the Roy H. Park School of Communications in 1989.

92 WICB is an affiliate of both Westwood One and the Associated Press, and has active news and sports departments, which cover such events as Ithaca College football, soccer, baseball, and lacrosse.

The radio station is Ithaca College's only FCC-licensed broadcast facility, and is in operation 24 hours a day, 365 days a year.

The Radio Station currently operates with 4,100 watts of effective radiated power that is able to reach much of Tompkins County and beyond. The signal is capable of reaching nearly 250,000 listeners from parts of Northern Pennsylvania up to Lake Ontario. The recent addition of a live streaming webcast has expanded potential listener-ship even more.

The station has a long-standing annual tradition of playing the radio station of Ithaca College's rival, SUNY Cortland, in a football game called the "Cortaca Mic". The game takes place in Cortland the evening before the annual Cortaca Jug game.

WICB is run almost entirely by a staff of student DJs and executives. Students of all majors are encouraged to work on the radio. Freshman all the way up to seniors at Ithaca College are allowed to be a part of WICB, though there is a required shadowing process along with an air check and written quiz. Aside from a technical and upper management support staff, all programming, talent coordination and promotions decisions are left up to a rotating executive board of students.

Awards and honors
WICB is most widely recognized as being ranked the #1 college radio station out of 364 colleges by the Princeton Review in 2010, 2014, and most recently in 2016.

In 2016, readers of the Ithaca Journal voted WICB as "Best Local Radio Station"  In 2005 and 2010, readers of the Ithaca Times voted 92 WICB "Best Radio Station." In 2008, WICB won an mtvU Woodie Award for Best College Radio Station.

WICB is an active member of College Broadcasters, Inc (CBI) and consistently places in the finals for the annual National Student Media Electronic Convention hosted by CBI. In October 2015, WICB was a finalist for Best Audio News Reporting and Best Audio Sports Reporting, and the winner of Best Audio Special Broadcast. In 2016, the station's Jazz Impressions show was a CBI finalist for "Best Station Promo."

Programming
WICB's staple format is modern rock.  While broadcasting modern rock, the station is run similarly to a commercial modern rock station, with the inclusion of playlists planned by the programming and music departments that include leeway for listener requests and DJ choices. Listeners are encouraged to call or text in and request songs for the DJs to play. WICB's full programming schedule is online at wicb.org/schedule.

Other major programming genres include Weekend Rhythms, Jazz Impressions and a number of specialty shows. Weekend Rhythms includes rap, hip-hop, and R&B. Jazz Impressions runs during the lunchtime every weekday and showcases both classic and modern jazz artists. Other specialty programs are run by both student DJs and community members. Many of the shows have developed loyal listener bases from being on the air for a number of years. Shows come from genres like the popularly syndicated Acoustic Café, blues, Broadway, reggae, and Americana/folk not normally heard on public airwaves.

Outside of mainstream music, WICB also provides an outlet for local bands. There is both a specialty show specifically for local music as well as segments throughout the day where local music is scheduled to be played. Very often bands will be brought in to perform live during "Homebrew" in addition to playing recordings from local groups.

Aside from music, WICB has expanded both sports and talk radio segments in recent years. WICB has also expanded into music and sports podcasts. Both the News and Sports departments at WICB are directed by student executives, with students providing live broadcasts during the morning and late afternoon. The WICB Sports department is responsible for broadcasting at nearly all major sporting events involving the Ithaca College Bombers, and live sportscasts 5 days a week.  The WICB News department is responsible for live newscasts 5 days a week, as well as producing the weekly news show Ithaca Now. It also produces a weekday news podcast called The Latest.

References

External links
WICB website

Radio stations established in 1947
Mass media in Ithaca, New York
Ithaca College
ICB
1947 establishments in New York (state)